J. Martyn Chamberlain,  (born 1947) is a British experimental physicist and academic. Having taught at the University of Nottingham and the University of Leeds, he joined Durham University as Professor of Applied Physics in 2003. From 2003 to 2011, he was also the Master of Grey College at the university. He retired in 2011.

References

 

 
 

Living people
Academics of Durham University
British physicists
Masters of Grey College, Durham
1947 births
Experimental physicists
Fellows of the Institute of Physics